Alexander Serikow (born 23 June 1975) is a German ice hockey player. He competed in the men's tournament at the 1994 Winter Olympics.

Career statistics

Regular season and playoffs

International

References

External links
 

1975 births
Living people
Olympic ice hockey players of Germany
Ice hockey players at the 1994 Winter Olympics
Sportspeople from Landshut
SC Bietigheim-Bissingen players
Adler Mannheim players
München Barons players
Hannover Scorpions players
Kassel Huskies players